There is no county-wide local education authority in Cheshire, instead education services are provided by the four smaller unitary authorities of Cheshire East, Cheshire West and Chester, Halton and Warrington:

 List of schools in Cheshire East
 List of schools in Cheshire West and Chester
 List of schools in Halton
 List of schools in Warrington